Yannick Kerlogot (born 12 May 1970) is a French politician of La République En Marche! (LREM) who has been serving as a member of the French National Assembly since the 2017 elections, representing the department of Côtes-d'Armor.

Political career
In parliament, Kerlogot serves on the Committee on Cultural Affairs and Education.

Political positions
In July 2019, Kerlogot decided not to align with his parliamentary group's majority and became one of 52 LREM members who abstained from a vote on the French ratification of the European Union’s Comprehensive Economic and Trade Agreement (CETA) with Canada.

See also
 2017 French legislative election

References

1970 births
Living people
Deputies of the 15th National Assembly of the French Fifth Republic
La République En Marche! politicians
Politicians from Saint-Brieuc
University of Rennes alumni